Siobhán Creaton is the current head of Public Affairs and Advocacy at the Royal College of Physicians in Ireland  and is a member of the Irish Street Arts, Circus and Spectacle board, having previously worked as a media adviser to Ruairi Quinn, Minister for Education and Skills, as well as director of communications for the Department of Education and Skills. She is a former Finance Correspondent with The Irish Times, and a former Business Correspondent with the Irish Independent.

In 2010 she published a book, A Mobile Fortune; the Life and Times of Denis O' Brien, an unauthorized biography of Denis O'Brien. She authored the first book about Ryanair, the low-fares airline. The book, Ryanair: How a Small Irish Airline Conquered Europe, was launched in May 2004 and later updated in 2007 to Ryanair: The full story of the controversial low-cost airline. Both were published by Aurum Press in paperback. She also co-wrote Panic At The Bank about John Rusnak, with Conor O'Clery.

References

External links
 Review of Creaton's book

Year of birth missing (living people)
Place of birth missing (living people)
Living people
Irish women journalists
Irish Independent people
Irish non-fiction writers
The Irish Times people